Wards River, a mostly perennial river of the Mid-Coast Council system, is located in the Mid North Coast and Upper Hunter regions of New South Wales, Australia.

Course and features
Wards River rises within Kyle Range of the Great Dividing Range, near Waukivory, south southeast of Gloucester, and flows generally west and south, joined by one minor tributary, before reaching its confluence with Mammy Johnsons River at the locale of Johnsons Creek, north of Stroud. The river descends  over its  course.

First surveyed by European explorers during the 1820s, the river was named in honour of William Ward, a founding director of Australian Agricultural Company.

See also

 Rivers of New South Wales
 List of rivers of New South Wales (L–Z)
 List of rivers of Australia

References

External links
 

Rivers of New South Wales
Mid-Coast Council
Rivers of the Hunter Region